Wayman may refer to:

People

Surname
Alex Wayman (1921–2004), Tibetologist, and Indologist, worked as a professor of Sanskrit at Columbia University
Charlie Wayman (1922–2006), English footballer
David Wayman (born 1988), English actor
Frank Wayman (1931–2008), English footballer
Jack Wayman (1922–2014), consumer electronics industry veteran and creator of the Consumer Electronics Show
James Lewis Wayman, American engineer
Michael Wayman (born 1953), British former professional tennis player
Nicholas Wayman-Harris, British film editor based in Santa Monica, California
Patrick Wayman (1927–1998), English astronomer and director of Dunsink Observatory from 1964 to 1992
Robert Wayman, the former chief financial officer and executive vice president of the Hewlett-Packard Company
Theresa Wayman (born 1980), aka TT, American musician, singer-songwriter and occasional actress
Thomas Wayman (1833–1901), English politician
Tom Wayman (born 1945), Canadian poet and academic
Tommy Wayman, retired American polo player

Given name
Wayman Elbridge Adams (1883–1959), American painter best known for his portraits of famous people
Wayman Britt (born 1952), retired American basketball player
Wayman Carver (1905–1967), American jazz flautist and reeds player
Wayman Crow (1808–1885), one of the founders of Washington University, a St. Louis businessmen and a politician
Wayman C. McCreery, (1851–1901), real estate agent, opera composer, internal revenue collector of St. Louis
Wayman Mitchell, the founder of Christian Fellowship Ministries or the Potters House
Wayman Presley (1896–1990), rural mail carrier in Makanda, Illinois
Wayman Tisdale (1964–2009), American professional basketball player in the NBA and a bass guitarist

Places

United States
Wayman, Missouri, ghost town
Wayman Hill, mountain in Schoharie County, New York
Waymansville, Indiana, unincorporated community

See also
Cryin' for Me (Wayman's Song), song written and recorded by country music artist Toby Keith on his 2009 album American Ride
Weymann (disambiguation)
Wyman (disambiguation)

